Janssens tegen Peeters is a 1939 Belgian comedy film directed by Jan Vanderheyden and starring Charles Janssens, Louisa Lausanne and Jef Bruyninckx. A sequel Janssens en Peeters dikke vrienden was released the following year.

Cast
 Charles Janssens - Tist Peeters  
 Louisa Lausanne - Melanie Peeters
 Jef Bruyninckx - Tony Peeters  
 Toontje Janssens - Grootvader Peeters  
 Pol Polus - Stan Janssens 
 Nini De Boël - Juliette Janssens  
 Martha Dua - Simonne Janssens  
 Louisa Colpeyn - Wieske Peeters  
 Gaston Smet - Fred Janssens  
 Nand Buyl - Polleke
 Serre Van Eeckhoudt - Oom Frans  
 Helena Haak - Tante Net  
 Fred Engelen - Zangleraar  
 Mitje Peenen - Marie meid van Janssens  
 Lily Vernon - Juffrouw Anna

External links

1939 films
Belgian comedy films
1930s Dutch-language films
Films directed by Jan Vanderheyden
Belgian black-and-white films
1939 comedy films